Anatoliy Volodymyrovych Reshetnyak or Anatolii Reshetniak (born 14 April 1955) is a Ukrainian middle-distance runner. He competed in the men's 800 metres at the 1980 Summer Olympics, representing the Soviet Union.

References

External links
 

1955 births
Living people
Athletes (track and field) at the 1980 Summer Olympics
Ukrainian male middle-distance runners
Soviet male middle-distance runners
Olympic athletes of the Soviet Union
People from Yevpatoria